The Department of Earth Sciences is the Earth Sciences department of the University of Oxford, England, which is part of the university's Mathematical, Physical and Life Sciences Division. The department is based in the Earth Sciences building on South Parks Road in the Science Area.

Overview 
The department's research is broad but with a particular emphasis on geochemistry, geophysics, natural hazards and climate, and was the top-ranked department nationally in the 2014 REF assessment as well as ranking highly in international league tables. The department teaches an undergraduate degree in Earth Sciences (leading to a 3-year BA in Geology or 4-year MEarthSci in Earth Sciences) with approximately 120 undergraduates, and entry is highly competitive. The course is interdisciplinary and quantitative, with a major research project in the fourth year. The department has 6 Multi-Collector Mass Spectrometers, 2 ICP Mass Spectrometers, specialised geochemistry, biogeochemistry and petrology laboratories including clean suites, a workshop for sample preparation and a library with c. 10,000 volumes (as well as map collections).

History 
Earth Sciences at the University of Oxford dates back to the 17th Century with the work of naturalists such as Edward Lhuyd and Robert Plot. However, the first formal appointment was in 1813, with William Buckland designated as Reader in Mineralogy, and later Professor of Geology. The establishment of the Oxford University Museum of Natural History in 1860 was influential in the history of Geology at the University, and has collaborated closely with the Department of Earth Sciences (established as the School of Geology in 1888) ever since. The School was based in the museum until 1949, where it moved into a new building opposite Keble College (now occupied by the Department of Computer Science). The department moved again in 2010 to the building it occupies now.

Notable people 

 William Buckland
 Charles Lyell
 John Phillips (geologist)
 Nevil Story Maskelyne
 Joseph Prestwich
 Alexander Henry Green
 Henry Alexander Miers
 William Johnson Sollas
 William Joscelyn Arkell
 John Bowman
 Lawrence Wager
 John Frederick Dewey
 Keith O'Nions
 John Woodhouse (geophysicist)
Don Fraser
 Philip England
 Alexander Halliday
 Bernie Wood
Tony Watts
 Chris Ballentine
 Gideon Henderson
 John-Michael Kendall 
 Tamsin Mather
Ros Rickaby
 William James Kennedy

References

External links 

 Website
 History of the department
 Twitter
Video introduction to the undergraduate course

Earth Sciences